Omonigho Temile (16 July 1984) is a Nigerian retired footballer.

Club career
Born in Lagos, Nigeria, Temile began his playing career at Nigerian football club Delta United from Warri. He started his professional career playing for Bulgarian side Cherno More in 2002. However, he signed for Levski Sofia in February 2003, teaming up with fellow Nigerians Garba Lawal and Justice Christopher. He made his debut on 28 February, against Marek. He was also a runner-up for the Best Young Player award of 2003/2004 season. Temile scored once for Levski in UEFA Cup.

In 2004, Temile went for trials with Ukrainian club Dynamo Kyiv in the summer, but eventually joined Russian Premier League side Krylia Sovetov. He signed a four and a half year contract.  He joined Warri Wolves in 2009 and signed in August 2010 for Maltese club side Valletta F.C.

International career
Temile was a member of Nigeria's U-17 squad that finished second in the 2001 FIFA U-17 World Championship held in Trinidad and Tobago. He started all six games, and scored twice from his midfield position. 
Temile  scored the last goal against Japan on a penalty kick in the 91st minute, in which Nigeria won 4-0. He was also on target in the 5-1 defeat of Australia in the quarter final. Nigeria eventually lost the final against France.

Personal life
Temile is the nephew of Clement Temile, cousin of Toto Tamuz, elder brother of Frank Temile.

Honours
Levski Sofia

 Bulgarian Cup: 2002–03

References

External links
Player Profile at LevskiSofia.info

1984 births
Living people
Nigerian footballers
Nigerian expatriate footballers
Nigeria international footballers
First Professional Football League (Bulgaria) players
PFC Krylia Sovetov Samara players
PFC Levski Sofia players
Botev Plovdiv players
PFC Cherno More Varna players
Expatriate footballers in Bulgaria
Expatriate footballers in Russia
Warri Wolves F.C. players
Nigerian expatriate sportspeople in Bulgaria
Delta Force F.C. players
Russian Premier League players
Association football midfielders
Omonigho
Sportspeople from Lagos